The Fugina House is a historic house located at 348 South Main Street in Fountain City, Wisconsin.

History 
The two-story house was built in 1916 for local judge Martin Fugina. It was designed in the Prairie School style by Frank Lloyd Wright student, Percy Dwight Bentley. It has remained in the Fugina family since its construction. It was added to the National Register of Historic Places on May 8, 1979.

References 

Houses on the National Register of Historic Places in Wisconsin
Houses completed in 1916
Houses in Buffalo County, Wisconsin
National Register of Historic Places in Buffalo County, Wisconsin
Prairie School architecture in Wisconsin